Galdames is a Spanish surname. Notable people with the surname include:

Benjamín Galdames (born 2001), Chilean footballer
Carlos Galdames (born 1980), Chilean footballer
José Manuel Galdames (born 1970), retired Spanish footballer
Pablo Galdames (born 1974), retired Chilean footballer, father of Pablo Galdames Millán
Pablo Galdames Millán (born 1996), Chilean footballer, son of Pablo Galdames
René Rojas Galdames (1919–1988), Chilean lawyer and diplomat

Spanish-language surnames